Ahmed Eisa Al-Nadhri (born 9 February 1993) is a Saudi professional footballer who plays for Al-Rawdhah as a midfielder .

References

External links
 

1993 births
Living people
Saudi Arabian footballers
Association football midfielders
Al-Rawdhah Club players
Hajer FC players
Ittihad FC players
Al-Qadsiah FC players
Al-Fateh SC players
Al-Adalah FC players
Place of birth missing (living people)
Saudi First Division League players
Saudi Professional League players
Saudi Arabia youth international footballers
Saudi Arabian Shia Muslims